Gatesclarkeana idia is a moth of the family Tortricidae. It is found in Japan, Taiwan, China, Indonesia, Thailand and Vietnam.

The wingspan is 13–15 mm for males and 12.5–16 mm for females. The forewings are pale ochreous tawny with a strong pink tinge, which is deeper along the costa. The hindwings are fuscous grey with a coppery gloss in some areas.

The larvae feed on Triadica sebifera and Melastoma malabathricum

References

Moths described in 1973
Gatesclarkeanini
Moths of Japan